Fanconi anemia group F protein is a protein that in humans is encoded by the FANCF gene.

Interactions 

FANCF has been shown to interact with Fanconi anemia, complementation group C, FANCG, FANCA and FANCE.

Function 
FANCF is an adaptor protein that plays a key role in the proper assembly of the FA core complex. The FA core complex is composed of eight proteins (FANCA, -B, -C, -E, -F, -G, -L and -M).  FANCF stabilizes the interaction between the FANCC/FANCE subcomplex and the FANCA/FANCG subcomplex and locks the whole FA core complex in a conformation that is essential to perform its function in DNA repair.

The FA core complex is a nuclear core complex that is essential for the monoubiquitination of FANCD2 and this modified form of FANCD2 colocalizes with BRCA1, RAD51 and PCNA in foci that also contain other DNA repair proteins.  All these proteins function together to facilitate DNA interstrand cross-link repair.  They also function in other DNA damage response repair processes including recovering and stabilizing stalled replication forks.  FoxF1 protein also interacts with the FA protein core and induces its binding to chromatin to promote DNA repair.

Cancer

DNA damage appears to be the primary underlying cause of cancer, and deficiencies in expression of DNA repair genes appear to underlie many forms of cancer.  If DNA repair is deficient, DNA damage tends to accumulate. Such excess DNA damage may increase mutations due to error-prone translesion synthesis. Excess DNA damage may also increase epigenetic alterations due to errors during DNA repair. Such mutations and epigenetic alterations may give rise to cancer.

Reductions in expression of DNA repair genes (usually caused by epigenetic alterations) are very common in cancers, and are most often much more frequent than mutational defects in DNA repair genes in cancers. (Also see Frequencies of epimutations in DNA repair genes.)

Methylation of the promoter region of the FANCF gene causes reduced expression of FANCF protein.

The frequencies of FANCF promoter methylation in several different cancers is indicated in the table.

In invasive breast cancers, microRNA-210 (miR-210) was increased, along with decreased expression of FANCF, where FANCF was one of the likely targets of miR-210.

Although mutations in FANCF are ordinarily not observed in human tumors, an FANCF-deficient mouse model was prone to ovarian cancers.

FANCF appears to be one of about 26 DNA repair genes that are epigenetically repressed in various cancers (see Cancer epigenetics).

Infertility

The gonads of FANCF mutant mice function abnormally, having compromised follicle development and spermatogenesis as has been observed in other Fanconi anemia mouse models and in Fanconi anemia patients.  Histological examination of the testes from FANCF-deficient mice showed that the seminiferous tubules were devoid of germ cells.  At 14 weeks of age, FANCF-deficient female mice were almost or completely devoid of primordial follicles.  It was concluded that FANCF-deficient mice display a rapid depletion of primordial follicles at a young age resulting in advanced ovarian aging.

References

Further reading

External links

Human proteins